Duke Jing of Jin (died 581 BC) was the ruler of the State of Jin, a major power during the Spring and Autumn period of ancient China,  from 599 to 581 BC. His ancestral name was Ji, given name Ju and Duke Jing was his posthumous title.  He succeeded his father Duke Cheng of Jin, who died in 600 BC.

Battle of Bi

In 597 BC, the third year of Duke Jing's rule, King Zhuang of Chu attacked the State of Zheng, then a Jin ally.  Duke Jing dispatched an army led by Xun Linfu (荀林父), Sui Hui (隨會), and Zhao Shuo (趙朔) to help Zheng. However, by the time the Jin army arrived Zheng had already surrendered to Chu.  Xun Linfu wanted to return to Jin, but general Xian Hu (先縠) persuaded him to attack Chu.  The Jin army was then decisively defeated at the Battle of Bi by the Chu and Zheng forces.  After the battle King Zhuang of Chu was recognized as the Hegemon of China.  Although Jin was weakened by the defeat, it was still one of the strongest states of China.  Just two years later Jin attacked Zheng in retaliation for helping Chu in the Battle of Bi.

Conquest of the Red Di
Xian Hu, who was partly responsible for Jin's defeat at the Battle of Bi, escaped to the Red Di tribes for fear of punishment.  In 596 BC, the Red Di people took advantage of Jin's recent defeat and attacked Jin with Xian Hu's help.  Jin killed Xian Hu and his entire clan.

Duke Jing's elder sister Bo Ji was the wife of Ying'er (嬰兒), the ruler of Lushi (潞氏), a major Red Di state.  In 594 BC Bo Ji was killed by the Lushi minister Feng Shu.  In retaliation, general Xun Linfu attacked Lushi, conquering the state and capturing its ruler Ying'er.  Feng Shu fled to the State of Wey but was returned to Jin and killed.  The following year, Jin conquered several more Red Di states or tribes.

Battle of An

In 589 BC the State of Qi, another major power, attacked the states of Lu and Wey, two Jin allies, and annexed the Lu city of Long.  In response, Duke Jing dispatched the Jin army led by generals Xi Ke, Shi Xie, Luan Shu, and Han Jue to help his allies.  The Jin and Qi forces fought at An (near present-day Jinan), and Jin decisively defeated Qi.  The Qi ruler Duke Qing narrowly escaped capture by exchanging clothes and position with officer Pang Choufu (逢丑父), who was taken prisoner by Han Jue mistaking him as Duke Qing.  After the battle Duke Qing was forced to plead for peace and cede territory to the state of Lu.  Winning the Battle of An enabled Jin to regain much of its prestige lost at the Battle of Bi, and expand its armed forces from three armies to six.

Abdication and death
In summer 581 BC, the 19th year of his reign, Duke Jing fell ill.  He abdicated in favor of his son Duke Li of Jin, and died a month later.  

The events surrounding his death are detailed in the Chinese classic text Zuo Zhuan. According to the Zuo Zhuan, the duke first dreamt of a malevolent spirit.  After waking, he consulted a wu (a shaman), who told him that he would not live to eat the new harvest's wheat.  The duke's illness worsened and he had a new dream in which two urchins, apparently personifying his disease, taunted him, saying that medicine cannot reach them.  A physician from the state of Qin was consulted.  He told the duke that the disease had reached the gaohuang (膏肓), the fatty region between the heart and diaphragm, and was therefore incurable.  The duke praised the physician for his skill, rewarded him lavishly and sent him away.  

On day bingwu of the sixth month (August-September), the duke asked for and was presented with the new harvest wheat.  Believing the shaman to have made a wrong prediction, he summoned him, showed him the new wheat, and had him executed.  Just as he was about to eat, the duke felt bloated, went to the toilet, fell in and died.  At noon, a slave carried the duke's body out of the toilet.  Earlier that morning, the slave had a dream that he was carrying his lord to the heavens.  Consequently, the slave was buried with the duke to serve him in the afterlife. This vivid account has given rise to a chengyu (four-character classical idiom), 病入膏肓 ('the disease has entered the gaohuang'), used to describe an incurable illness, or more broadly, a situation beyond remediation.

Footnotes

References

Monarchs of Jin (Chinese state)
6th-century BC Chinese monarchs
581 BC deaths
Year of birth unknown